George Clarke (1932–2005) was an influential architect and town planner active in Australia during the 1970s. He was one of the principal contributors to the development of the 1971 City of Sydney Strategic Plan, the 1974 City of Adelaide Plan, and in 1965, the first uniform residential development codes in Western Australia.

Career

After graduating from the University of Sydney as an architect in the early 1950s, George Clarke worked as a regional planner under Arthur Winston at the Cumberland County Council in 1953. He would go on to study on an Italian scholarship, before moving to America where he studied with Lewis Mumford at MIT, and worked for architect I. M. Pei in New York. He would gain further experience in London before returning to Australia in the late 1960s and establishing the consultancy of Clarke, Gazzard and Partners.

In the late 1970s Clarke left Australia to live and work in Bali, Japan, Zimbabwe, Somalia, Brunei and Tovalu.

Upon his death in 2005 Clarke was memorialised by the Lord Mayor of Sydney, and a plaque installed on Sinclair Street opposite the College of Fine Art.

References 

1932 births
2005 deaths
20th-century Australian architects
University of Sydney alumni
Massachusetts Institute of Technology alumni